Greece was represented by 11 athletes at the 1990 European Athletics Championships held in Split, Yugoslavia.

Results

References

http://www.sansimera.gr/articles/804

 

1990
Nations at the 1990 European Athletics Championships
1990 in Greek sport